Bidur Bahadur Shah (better known as Bidur Shah) was a Nepalese noble who served as Chautaria under the reign of Rana Bahadur Shah.

Biography 
Bidur Bahadur Shah was born at Hanuman Dhoka to King Pratap Singh Shah and Maiju Rani Maneshvari Devi. His mother was from a Newar family and the concubine of the king.

Shah was promoted to Chautaria by Rana Bahadur Shah with his brother Sher Bahadur Shah.

Shah had maintained  close contact with the future Mukhtiyar (equivalent to prime minister) Bhimsen Thapa.

Bidur Bahadur Shah was assassinated on 25 April 1806.

References 

1806 deaths
18th-century Nepalese nobility
18th-century Nepalese people
Assassinated Nepalese politicians
Nepalese Hindus
People from Kathmandu
People murdered in Nepal
People of the Nepalese unification
Shah dynasty
Nepalese princes